"Arsenal Number One" was a single released by the English football team Arsenal, as a double A-side with "Our Goal", in 2000.  It reached number 46 in the UK Singles Chart.

References

2000 singles
Arsenal F.C. songs
Football songs and chants
2000 songs
Song articles with missing songwriters